Stukely-Sud is a village of 950 people, part of the Memphrémagog Regional County Municipality in the Estrie region of Quebec, Canada.

History
Stukely-Sud was originally created on June 3, 1847, when the township municipality of Stukely was spitted in two different municipalities: South Stukely and North Stukely. North Stukely would eventually disband in three other municipalities (Lawrenceville, Bonsecours and Sainte-Anne-de-la-Rochelle). On the other hand, South Stukely will continue on until 1935 when the urban part of the municipality will split off to form the new village municipality of Stukeley-Sud which still stand today.

Meanwhile, the rural section would also change to the French name Stukely-Sud in 1969. In 1993, it will change to only Stukely and would eventually be merged into Eastman in 2001.

Demographics 

Population trend:

Mother tongue (2011)

See also 
 List of village municipalities in Quebec

References

External links

Villages in Quebec
Incorporated places in Estrie